John de Ferrers may refer to:
John de Ferrers, 1st Baron Ferrers of Chartley
John de Ferrers, 4th Baron Ferrers of Chartley

See also
John Ferrers (disambiguation)